The Seasons (Chinese: 季節) was a 389 episode drama series that was shown during Enjoy Yourself Tonight on Hong Kong TV station TVB from 1987 to 1988. The show, being a section of the main program, Enjoy Yourself Tonight (EYT), meant that it was only 15 minutes long, a rarity in Hong Kong television drama programs. Another rarity is that each episode ends in the same shot: a flower being tossed into the water.

Cast

Tong family
First Generation

Second Generation

Other cast

Background
In the 1980s. EYT was steadily losing viewers as other modes of entertainment becomes available. The program was conceived by EYT producers to counter the loss of viewership. The show, along with two other short-form programs (one was a mystery program, the other a comedy), did much to revive EYT, and allowed it to return to viewership supremacy.

References in popular culture
Due to the immense popularity of the show, the show was referenced in the movie "It's a Mad Mad Mad World 2", starring fellow EYT alum Lydia Shum. In a section of the film, Shum's character, along with her husband (portrayed by Bill Tung, desperately needed money to return to Canada. They returned to the Public Housing estate where they used to live, and try to find their old mahjong playing neighbors for emergency cash. When they arrived, they found these neighbors children playing mahjong, who said that their parents are watching The Seasons, and will not move or go anywhere unless a fire has started. This led to the couple screaming fire, resulting in everyone from the estate streaming out of their homes.

1987 Hong Kong television series debuts
1988 Hong Kong television series endings
Hong Kong television soap operas
Cantonese-language television shows